Nils Fredrik Höijer (1857 – 20 November 1925) was a Swedish missionary to Central Asia. In 1892 he accompanied Johannes Avetaranian to Kashgar. He did not however, stay in Kashgar.

In 1903 he founded Swedish Slavic Mission (today known as Ljus i Öster Light for the Peoples), a missionary organization that today has missionaries in works in the CIS, Eastern Europe, Turkey, Mongolia and China.

Bibliography
Avateranian, Johannes & Bechard, John (tr); A Muslim Who Became A Christian (Hertford: Authors Online Ltd.)
Ann-Charlotte Fritzon, Passion för det omöjliga Om pionjären Nils Fredrik Höijer Slaviska Missionen - Bromma Malmö 1993
Ann-Charlotte Fritzon, Passion for the Impossible

External links
Ljus i Öster
Dagen.se bio of Nils Fredrik Höijer 

Swedish Protestant missionaries
Protestant missionaries in China
Christian missionaries in Central Asia
1857 births
1925 deaths
Swedish expatriates in China